The 1956 Brown Bears football team was an American football team that represented Brown University as a member of the Ivy League during the 1956 NCAA University Division football season. 

In their sixth season under head coach Alva Kelley, the Bears compiled a 5–4 record and outscored opponents 124 to 94. Richard "Dick" Bence was the team captain.  

The Bears' 3–4 conference record was good for fifth in the Ivy League. This was the first season of formal play for the Ivy League, although the Bears' previous  independent schedules, dating back to the 19th century, often featured future Ivy opponents. Six of the seven Ivy matchups on Brown's 1956 schedule had been present on the 1955 slate, as well (as had the two remaining non-Ivy fixtures, Colgate and URI). 

Brown played its home games at Brown Stadium in Providence, Rhode Island.

Schedule

References

Brown
Brown Bears football seasons
Brown Bears football